Elsa Turakainen (8 August 1904 – 7 February 1992) was a Finnish actress. She appeared in more than 30 films and television shows between 1934 and 1973.

Selected filmography
 Skandaali tyttökoulussa (1960)
 Little Presents (1961)

References

External links

1904 births
1992 deaths
Actresses from Helsinki
People from Uusimaa Province (Grand Duchy of Finland)
Finnish film actresses
20th-century Finnish actresses